Guillermo Chifflet (1926 – 26 April 2020) was an Uruguayan journalist and politician who served as a Deputy and co-founded the Broad Front.

References

1926 births
2020 deaths
Uruguayan people of French descent
Uruguayan politicians
Uruguayan socialists